Aspendale may refer to:
Aspendale, Victoria in Australia
Aspendale (Kenton) in Delaware, United States